Stanko Bilinski (22 April 1909 in Našice – 6 April 1998 in Zagreb) was a Croatian mathematician and academician. He was a professor at the University of Zagreb and a fellow of the Croatian Academy of Sciences and Arts.

In 1960, he discovered a rhombic dodecahedron of the second kind, the Bilinski dodecahedron. Like the standard rhombic dodecahedron, this convex polyhedron has 12 congruent rhombus sides, but they are differently shaped and arranged. Bilinski's discovery corrected a 75-year-old omission in Evgraf Fedorov's classification of convex polyhedra with congruent rhombic faces.

References

Further reading
 
 

1909 births
1998 deaths
Croatian mathematicians
Academic staff of the University of Zagreb
Members of the Croatian Academy of Sciences and Arts
20th-century Croatian mathematicians
People from Našice
Geometers